Macadamia oil (or macadamia nut oil) is the non-volatile oil collected from the nuts of the macadamia (Macadamia integrifolia), a native Australian plant. It is used in food as a frying or salad oil, and in cosmetic formulations as an emollient or fragrance fixative.

Description

Fruits
Macadamia integrifolia is an Australian tree with holly-like leaves that grows well in a moist organic soil and can withstand temperatures as low as −4.4 °C (24 °F). Seedlings bear in 5–7 years. The fruit is borne in a case enclosing an extremely hard spherical nut. The kernel is whitish, sweet and eaten raw or roasted. The flowers are white to cream and the leaves are in whorls of three. Propagation is by seed, grafting or air layering. It is grown commercially.

Common names of the trees are the Australian nut or the Queensland nut. Species that are “smooth shelled macadamia” are called Macadamia integrifolia and “rough shelled macadamia” are called Macadamia tetraphylla. Macadamia ternifolia is also the name used for M. integrifolia. Macadamia integrifolia is native to Australia where it grows in rain forests and close to streams. Macadamia tetraphylla is native to Southeastern Queensland and Northeastern New South Wales.

Oil
The oil content ranges from 65% to 75% and sugar content ranges from 6% to 8%. These factors result in variable colors and texture when the nuts are roasted under the same conditions.

Macadamia oil is liquid at room temperature.  The refined oil is clear, lightly amber-colored with a slightly nutty smell. It has a specific gravity of 900–920  and a flash point of over 300 °C  (572 °F).

Oil accumulation does not commence until the nuts are fully grown and the shell hardens. It accumulates rapidly in the kernel during late summer when the reducing sugar content decreases. The composition of mature, roasted and salted macadamia nuts is shown. As with many oil seeds, the protein is low in methionine. Fresh kernels contain up to 4.6% sugar, mostly non-reducing sugar. The oil consists of mainly unsaturated fatty acids and is similar in both species, although the proportion of unsaturated to saturated fatty acids appears to be slightly higher in M. integrifolia (6.2:1 compared with 4.8:1). The fatty acid composition and the absence of cholesterol may lead to the promotion of macadamias as a high-energy health food. The major volatile components in roasted macadamia kernels are apparently similar to those found in other roasted nuts, although little detailed information is available.

Uses in food 
Macadamia oil can be used for frying due to its high heat capacity along with other properties useful as an edible oil:

 Contains up to 85% monounsaturated fats
 Unrefrigerated shelf life of one to two years
 Smoke point of 210 °C (410 °F)
 Flashpoint of over 300 °C (572 °F)

Fatty acids
Macadamia oil contains approximately 60% oleic acid, 19% palmitoleic acid, 1-3% linoleic acid and 1-2% α-linolenic acid.  The oil displays chemical properties typical of a vegetable triglyceride oil, as it is stable due to its low polyunsaturated fat content.

References

External links
 How Products are Made: Macadamia Nut 

Cosmetics chemicals
Cooking oils
Macadamia
Nut oils